Pai Kok station is a station on the Taipa line of the Macau Light Rapid Transit in Taipa, Macau. It was opened on 10 December 2019. The station is located near the Venetian Macau and Galaxy Macau, as well as landmarks in Vila da Taipa (the old town of Taipa) such as Rua do Cunha and Taipa Houses–Museum.

History 
During planning, this station was originally named Villa da Taipa. The name was changed to Pai Kok in 2009.

The construction of the station began in 2014.

Station layout

References 

Light rail in Macau
Railway stations in China opened in 2019